William Joyner (January 1868 – death date unknown) was an American Negro league outfielder in the 1890s and 1900s.

A native of Sumner County, Tennessee, Joyner played for the Chicago Unions in 1896 and 1897. He went on to play for the Leland Giants in 1901 and 1902.

References

External links
Baseball statistics and player information from Baseball-Reference Black Baseball Stats and Seamheads

1868 births
Date of birth missing
Year of death missing
Place of death missing
Chicago Unions players
Leland Giants players